Jacques de Crussol is the son of Louis de Crussol, a member of the chivalric Order of Saint-Michel. Born into a relatively small inheritance of the castle Crussol - later abandoned in favour of the castle in Uzès - Jacques was the first of his house to become viscount of Uzès. After the husband of the only daughter of the house of Uzès died without having left any successors, Jacques was the next to marry Simone d'Uzès. They married on 24 June 1486 and the two houses were thus joined on the condition that the house of Crussol would thereafter accept both the name of the house of Uzès and its coat of arms, incorporating it into their own.

See also
 Viscounts and Dukes of Uzès

References

1460 births
1525 deaths